Lake Agnes is a lake in Douglas County, in the U.S. state of Minnesota in the watershed of Long Prairie River.

Lake Agnes was named for a pioneer settler's love interest.

See also
List of lakes in Minnesota

References

Lakes of Minnesota
Lakes of Douglas County, Minnesota